Perelandra is the second studio album by American progressive rock band Glass Hammer, released on November 1, 1995.

A concept album, it was inspired by C. S. Lewis' The Chronicles of Narnia and Space Trilogy book series. It is the only album to feature singer Michelle Young as band member, although she had appeared on their first album Journey of the Dunadan and would later appear on their fourteenth Ode to Echo in 2014, both as a guest.

Track listing

Personnel 
 Glass Hammer
 Fred Schendel – Lead and backing vocals, keyboards, acoustic and electric guitars, drums, programming, Mellotron
 Steve Babb – lead and backing vocals, keyboards, bass, taurus pedals, Mellotron, zoominator, rhythm programming
 Walter Moore – lead vocals, 12-string acoustic guitar, mo-better electric guitar
 Michelle Young – lead vocals

 Additional musicians
 Milton Hamerick – steel guitars
 Randy Burt – saxophone
 Tracy Cloud – backing vocals, spoken vocals
 David Carter – 12-string guitar on “Into the Night”

References

External links 
 Perelandra on the Glass Hammer Official website

Glass Hammer albums
1995 albums